Alexander Keewatin Dewdney (born August 5, 1941) is a Canadian mathematician, computer scientist, author, filmmaker, and conspiracy theorist. Dewdney is the son of Canadian artist and author Selwyn Dewdney, and brother of poet Christopher Dewdney.

He was born in London, Ontario.

Art and fiction
In his student days, Dewdney made a number of influential experimental films, including Malanga, on the poet Gerald Malanga, Four Girls, Scissors, and his most ambitious film, the pre-structural Maltese Cross Movement. Margaret Atwood wrote that a poetry scrapbook by Dewdney, based on the Maltese Cross Movement film, "raises scrapbooking to an art".

The Academy Film Archive has preserved two of Dewdney's films:  The Maltese Cross Movement in 2009 and Wildwood Flower in 2011.

He has also written two novels, The Planiverse (about an imaginary two-dimensional world) and Hungry Hollow: The Story of a Natural Place. Dewdney lives in London, Ontario, Canada, where he holds the position of Professor Emeritus at the University of Western Ontario.

Computing, mathematics, and science
Dewdney has written a number of books on mathematics, computing, and bad science. He also founded and edited a magazine on recreational programming called Algorithm between 1989 and 1993.

Dewdney followed Martin Gardner and Douglas Hofstadter in authoring Scientific American magazine's recreational mathematics column, renamed to "Computer Recreations", then "Mathematical Recreations", from 1984 to 1991. He has published more than 10 books on scientific possibilities and puzzles.  Dewdney was a co-inventor of programming game Core War.

Since the nineties, Dewdney has worked on biology, both as a field ecologist and as a mathematical biologist, contributing a solution to the problem of determining the underlying dynamics of species abundance in natural communities.

Conspiracy theories
Dewdney is a member of the 9/11 truth movement, and has theorized that the planes used in the September 11 attacks had been emptied of passengers and were flown by remote control.
He based these claims in part on a series of experiments (one with funding from Japan's TV Asahi) that, he claims, show that cell phones do not work on airplanes, from which he concludes that the phone calls received from hijacked passengers during the attacks must have been faked.

Works
The Planiverse: Computer Contact with a Two-Dimensional World (1984). .
The Armchair Universe: An Exploration of Computer Worlds (1988). . (collection of "Mathematical Recreations" columns)
The Magic Machine: A Handbook of Computer Sorcery (1990). . (collection of "Mathematical Recreations" columns)
The New Turing Omnibus: Sixty-Six Excursions in Computer Science (1993). .
The Tinkertoy Computer and Other Machinations (1993).  . (collection of "Mathematical Recreations" columns)
Introductory Computer Science: Bits of Theory, Bytes of Practice (1996).  .
200% of Nothing: An Eye Opening Tour Through the Twists and Turns of Math Abuse and Innumeracy (1996). .
Yes, We Have No Neutrons: An Eye-Opening Tour through the Twists and Turns of Bad Science (1997).  .
Hungry Hollow: The Story of a Natural Place (1998). .
A Mathematical Mystery Tour: Discovering the Truth and Beauty of the Cosmos (2001). .
Beyond Reason: Eight Great Problems that Reveal the Limits of Science (2004). .

References

External links
Alexander Dewdney homepage

1941 births
Canadian mathematicians
Recreational mathematicians
Mathematics popularizers
Canadian Muslims
Canadian male non-fiction writers
Living people
Film directors from London, Ontario
Scientists from Ontario
Writers from London, Ontario
Canadian conspiracy theorists
Canadian experimental filmmakers
20th-century Canadian non-fiction writers
21st-century Canadian non-fiction writers